Jujhar Singh
(9 April 1691 – 22 December 1704), the second son of Gobind Singh, was born to Mata Jito at Anandpur Sahib. This event is now celebrated on April 9 each year according to the Nanakshahi Calendar.

Gallery

See also 

Ajit Singh
Zorawar Singh
Fateh Singh
Martyrdom in Sikhism

Notes

References
 Kuir Singh Gurbilds Pdtshdhi 10. Patiala, 1968
 Chhibbar, Kesar Singh, Rnnsdvalindma Dasdn Pdlshdhldn Kd. Chandigarh, 1972
 Gian Singh, Giani, Panth Prakdsh. Patiala, 1970
 Padam, Piara Singh, Char Sdhihidde. Patiala, 1970
 Macauliffe, Max Arthur, The Sikh Religion. Oxford, 1909

External links

Sikh martyrs
Sikh warriors
Family members of the Sikh gurus
History of Punjab
1691 births
1705 deaths
Punjabi people